Annalong Forest is located near the village of Annalong in County Down, Northern Ireland. It is made up of two sections: Annalong Wood and Silent Valley. The forest consists of various species of conifer. It is part of the Mourne Area of Outstanding Natural Beauty. There have been two major forest fires in the area since 2011. One, which started on 30 April 2011, required 10 fire engines to extinguish and caused the temporary closure of several roads. Another, on 24 April 2010, destroyed approximately 50 hectares of gorse and was believed to have been started deliberately.

References

Forests and woodlands of Northern Ireland